A Jewel in Pawn is a 1917 American silent drama film directed by Jack Conway and starring Ella Hall, Maie Hall and Antrim Short.

Cast
 Ella Hall as Nora Martin 
 Maie Hall as Mrs. Martin 
 Antrim Short as Jimmy 
 Walter Belasco as Aaron Levovitch 
 Jack Connolly as Bob Hendricks 
 George C. Pearce as John Dane 
 Marshall Mackaye as The Bully 
 Jack Nelson as Percival Van Dyke

References

Bibliography
 James Robert Parish & Michael R. Pitts. Film directors: a guide to their American films. Scarecrow Press, 1974.

External links
 

1917 films
1917 drama films
1910s English-language films
American silent feature films
Silent American drama films
Films directed by Jack Conway
American black-and-white films
Universal Pictures films
1910s American films